Dentisociaria armata is a species of moth of the family Tortricidae. It is found in the Russian Far East (Amur, Primorsky Krai), China and Japan. The habitat consists of broad-leaved forests, but the species has also been observed in inhabited areas such as parks.

The wingspan is 15–23 mm. Adults have been recorded on wing from July to September.

Subspecies
Dentisociaria armata armata
Dentisociaria armata okui Yasuda, 1975 (Japan)

References

Moths described in 1970
Archipini